Nancy Lin is an American oncologist who works at the Dana-Farber Cancer Institute and is an Associate Professor of Medicine at Harvard Medical School. Her research considers new diagnostic strategies and treatment pathways for HER2 positive breast cancer.

Early life and education 
Lin was trained in medicine at Harvard Medical School. She remained in Massachusetts for her residency and fellowship, during which she was based at the Brigham and Women's Hospital. She completed her fellowship in oncology at the Dana–Farber Cancer Institute. She was awarded the Breast Cancer Research Foundation Westchester Women's Award in Memory of Marla Mehlman in 2007.

Research and career 
After completing her medical training, Lin focused on the diagnosis, treatment and outcomes of people with breast cancer. In particular, she worked on HER2 positive breast cancer and breast cancer patients with brain metastasis. Lin has developed novel pharmaceuticals for patients whose breast cancer has spread to the brain. Cancer-related central nervous system and brain metastases result in genomic alterations which are poorly understood. Lin has used the EMBRACE (Ending Metastatic Breast Cancer for Everyone) database, which contains information from several thousand metastatic breast cancer patients. She sequenced almost 800 tumor samples. These investigations will help to identify genomic predictors of breast cancer related metastases.

Lin is interested in the effectiveness of antibody-drug conjugates in early and metastatic-stage breast cancer. Amongst these, trastuzumab deruxtecan has demonstrated intracranial activity. She showed that Tucatinib in combination with trastuzumab can improve the outcomes of people with breast cancer and brain metastasis. Lin was made the Associate Chief of Breast Oncology at the Dana–Farber Cancer Institute in 2018.

Selected publications

References 

Living people
Year of birth missing (living people)
American oncologists

Women oncologists
Harvard Medical School alumni